The 1st constituency of the Puy-de-Dôme (French: Première circonscription du Puy-de-Dôme) is a French legislative constituency in the Puy-de-Dôme département. Like the other 576 French constituencies, it elects one MP using a two-round election system.

Description

The 1st constituency of the Puy-de-Dôme includes most of Clermont-Ferrand in the heart of the department. The city is home to Michelin as well as a host of other major industries.

The constituency has generally opted for left wing deputies with the exception of 1993 and 2017 in recent decades. At the 2017 election the previously dominant Socialist Party trailed in 5th with only 9% of the vote, the left-wing vote being swept up by La France Insoumise who came second. La France Insoumise won the seat at the following election in 2022, as part of the left-wing NUPES alliance.

Assembly Members

Election results

2022

 
 
|-
| colspan="8" bgcolor="#E9E9E9"|
|-

2017

|- style="background-color:#E9E9E9;text-align:center;"
! colspan="2" rowspan="2" style="text-align:left;" | Candidate
! rowspan="2" colspan="2" style="text-align:left;" | Party
! colspan="2" | 1st round
! colspan="2" | 2nd round
|- style="background-color:#E9E9E9;text-align:center;"
! width="75" | Votes
! width="30" | %
! width="75" | Votes
! width="30" | %
|-
| style="background-color:" |
| style="text-align:left;" | Valérie Thomas
| style="text-align:left;" | La République En Marche!
| LREM
| 
| 40.56
| 
| 57.01
|-
| style="background-color:" |
| style="text-align:left;" | Alain Laffont
| style="text-align:left;" | La France Insoumise
| FI
| 
| 15.58
| 
| 42.99
|-
| style="background-color:" |
| style="text-align:left;" | Maxime Vergnault
| style="text-align:left;" | The Republicans
| LR
| 
| 9.79
| colspan="2" style="text-align:left;" |
|-
| style="background-color:" |
| style="text-align:left;" | Anne Biscos
| style="text-align:left;" | National Front
| FN
| 
| 9.29
| colspan="2" style="text-align:left;" |
|-
| style="background-color:" |
| style="text-align:left;" | Cécile Audet
| style="text-align:left;" | Socialist Party
| PS
| 
| 9.29
| colspan="2" style="text-align:left;" |
|-
| style="background-color:" |
| style="text-align:left;" | Bertrand Pasciuto
| style="text-align:left;" | Miscellaneous Left
| DVG
| 
| 6.77
| colspan="2" style="text-align:left;" |
|-
| style="background-color:" |
| style="text-align:left;" | Cyril Cineux
| style="text-align:left;" | Communist Party
| PCF
| 
| 2.55
| colspan="2" style="text-align:left;" |
|-
| style="background-color:" |
| style="text-align:left;" | Damien Folio
| style="text-align:left;" | Ecologist
| ECO
| 
| 2.26
| colspan="2" style="text-align:left;" |
|-
| style="background-color:" |
| style="text-align:left;" | Antoine Rechagneux
| style="text-align:left;" | Debout la France
| DLF
| 
| 1.10
| colspan="2" style="text-align:left;" |
|-
| style="background-color:" |
| style="text-align:left;" | Charlène Drigeard
| style="text-align:left;" | Independent
| DIV
| 
| 0.75
| colspan="2" style="text-align:left;" |
|-
| style="background-color:" |
| style="text-align:left;" | Elena Fourcroy
| style="text-align:left;" | Independent
| DIV
| 
| 0.74
| colspan="2" style="text-align:left;" |
|-
| style="background-color:" |
| style="text-align:left;" | Dominique Leclair
| style="text-align:left;" | Far Left
| EXG
| 
| 0.56
| colspan="2" style="text-align:left;" |
|-
| style="background-color:" |
| style="text-align:left;" | Sandrine Clavières
| style="text-align:left;" | Far Left
| EXG
| 
| 0.48
| colspan="2" style="text-align:left;" |
|-
| style="background-color:" |
| style="text-align:left;" | Frédéric La Carbona
| style="text-align:left;" | Independent
| DIV
| 
| 0.19
| colspan="2" style="text-align:left;" |
|-
| style="background-color:" |
| style="text-align:left;" | Carole Martel El Mehdaoui
| style="text-align:left;" | Miscellaneous Right
| DVD
| 
| 0.11
| colspan="2" style="text-align:left;" |
|-
| style="background-color:" |
| style="text-align:left;" | Alexandre Pourchon
| style="text-align:left;" | Miscellaneous Left
| DVG
| 
| 0.00
| colspan="2" style="text-align:left;" |
|-
| colspan="8" style="background-color:#E9E9E9;"|
|- style="font-weight:bold"
| colspan="4" style="text-align:left;" | Total
| 
| 100%
| 
| 100%
|-
| colspan="8" style="background-color:#E9E9E9;"|
|-
| colspan="4" style="text-align:left;" | Registered voters
| 
| style="background-color:#E9E9E9;"|
| 
| style="background-color:#E9E9E9;"|
|-
| colspan="4" style="text-align:left;" | Blank ballots
| 
| 1.34%
| 
| 5.42%
|-
| colspan="4" style="text-align:left;" | Void ballots
| 
| 0.56%
| 
| 2.54%
|-
| colspan="4" style="text-align:left;" | Turnout
| 
| 46.60%
| 
| 41.18%
|-
| colspan="4" style="text-align:left;" | Abstentions
| 
| 53.40%
| 
| 58.82%
|-
| colspan="8" style="background-color:#E9E9E9;"|
|- style="font-weight:bold"
| colspan="6" style="text-align:left;" | Result
| colspan="2" style="background-color:" | REM GAIN FROM PS
|}

2012

|- style="background-color:#E9E9E9;text-align:center;"
! colspan="2" rowspan="2" style="text-align:left;" | Candidate
! rowspan="2" colspan="2" style="text-align:left;" | Party
! colspan="2" | 1st round
! colspan="2" | 2nd round
|- style="background-color:#E9E9E9;text-align:center;"
! width="75" | Votes
! width="30" | %
! width="75" | Votes
! width="30" | %
|-
| style="background-color:" |
| style="text-align:left;" | Odile Saugues
| style="text-align:left;" | Socialist Party
| PS
| 
| 44.82
| 
| 67.63
|-
| style="background-color:" |
| style="text-align:left;" | Jean-Pierre Brenas
| style="text-align:left;" | Union for a Popular Movement
| UMP
| 
| 20.66
| 
| 32.37
|-
| style="background-color:" |
| style="text-align:left;" | Jacqueline Simon
| style="text-align:left;" | National Front
| FN
| 
| 10.23
| colspan="2" style="text-align:left;" |
|-
| style="background-color:" |
| style="text-align:left;" | CANDIDATE
| style="text-align:left;" | Left Front
| FG
| 
| 7.22
| colspan="2" style="text-align:left;" |
|-
| style="background-color:" |
| style="text-align:left;" | Alain Laffont
| style="text-align:left;" | Far Left
| EXG
| 
| 5.50
| colspan="2" style="text-align:left;" |
|-
| style="background-color:" |
| style="text-align:left;" | Michel Fanget
| style="text-align:left;" | Democratic Movement
| MoDem
| 
| 4.84
| colspan="2" style="text-align:left;" |
|-
| style="background-color:" |
| style="text-align:left;" | Yves Reverseau
| style="text-align:left;" | Europe Ecology – The Greens
| EELV
| 
| 2.94
| colspan="2" style="text-align:left;" |
|-
| style="background-color:" |
| style="text-align:left;" | Monique Bonnet
| style="text-align:left;" | Citizen and Republican Movement
| MRC
| 
| 1.20
| colspan="2" style="text-align:left;" |
|-
| style="background-color:" |
| style="text-align:left;" | Joëlle Girard
| style="text-align:left;" | Ecologist
| ECO
| 
| 0.84
| colspan="2" style="text-align:left;" |
|-
| style="background-color:" |
| style="text-align:left;" | Véronique Sure
| style="text-align:left;" | Independent Ecological Alliance
| AEI
| 
| 0.60
| colspan="2" style="text-align:left;" |
|-
| style="background-color:" |
| style="text-align:left;" | Saliha Denane
| style="text-align:left;" | Radical Party
| PR
| 
| 0.59
| colspan="2" style="text-align:left;" |
|-
| style="background-color:" |
| style="text-align:left;" | Marie Savre
| style="text-align:left;" | Workers' Struggle
| LO
| 
| 0.56
| colspan="2" style="text-align:left;" |
|-
| colspan="8" style="background-color:#E9E9E9;"|
|- style="font-weight:bold"
| colspan="4" style="text-align:left;" | Total
| 
| 100%
| 
| 100%
|-
| colspan="8" style="background-color:#E9E9E9;"|
|-
| colspan="4" style="text-align:left;" | Registered voters
| 
| style="background-color:#E9E9E9;"|
| 
| style="background-color:#E9E9E9;"|
|-
| colspan="4" style="text-align:left;" | Blank/Void ballots
| 
| 1.29%
| 
| 4.42%
|-
| colspan="4" style="text-align:left;" | Turnout
| 
| 54.23%
| 
| 51.00%
|-
| colspan="4" style="text-align:left;" | Abstentions
| 
| 45.77%
| 
| 49.00%
|-
| colspan="8" style="background-color:#E9E9E9;"|
|- style="font-weight:bold"
| colspan="6" style="text-align:left;" | Result
| colspan="2" style="background-color:" | PS hold
|}

References

1